The Victoria Conference Centre is a conference centre located in the downtown core of Victoria, British Columbia, Canada. In January 2008, the centre received a  upgrade through the Canada-B.C. Municipal Rural Infrastructure Fund, making it the second largest conference centre in British Columbia.

References

External links
 
 

1989 establishments in British Columbia
Buildings and structures completed in 1989
Buildings and structures in Victoria, British Columbia
Convention centres in Canada